In the United States the Alien Species Prevention and Enforcement Act of 1992 (P.L. 102–393) makes it illegal to ship certain categories of plants and animals through the mail.  The prohibited species are certain injurious animals, plant pests, plants and materials under federal quarantine, and certain plants and animals under the Lacey Act (16 U.S.C. 3371–3378), a law that pertains to illegal trade in fish, wildlife, and plants.  These also may be referred to as invasive species. The idea behind the piece of legislation is to protect native species and maintain a relatively high level of biodiversity.

See also
Invasive species in the United States

References 

1992 in law
102nd United States Congress
United States federal agriculture legislation
Environmental law in the United States
Invasive species in the United States
1992 in the environment